St. Mary's Group of Institutions is an Indian educational society. It is run by the Joseph Sriharsha & Mary Indraja Educational Society, a Christian Minority Educational society. It has over 17,000 students from 29 states of India and 45 Countries.

The Group is permanently recognized as a Christian Minority Institution by ACMEI, New Delhi.

The Group is approved by AICTE, PCI, NCTE and The Group colleges are affiliated to JNTU Hyderabad, Osmania University, Mahatma Gandhi University, Acharya Nagarjuna University, JNTU Kakinada University, and Maulana Abul Kalam Azad University of Technology (Formerly Known as West Bengal University of Technology).

Campuses 
The Group has branch campuses in Hyderabad, Kolkata, Prakasam, and Guntur. The group's Hyderabad campus is set in 120 acres of land amidst scenic valleys and hills.

Organisation

The Group is composed of the following schools:

 St. Mary's Integrated Campus Hyderabad- Affiliated to JNTU Hyderabad
 St. Mary's College of Engineering and Technology -Patancheru (SMCET)
 St. Marys B.Ed College-Prakasam-Affiliated to Acharya Nagarjuna University, Guntur
St. Mary's MBA College -Affiliated to Acharya Nagarjuna University, Guntur
St. Mary's MCA College -Affiliated to Acharya Nagarjuna University, Guntur
 St. Mary's Women's engineering college-Budampadu- Affiliated to JNTU Kakinada
 St. Mary's Technical Campus Kolkata - Affiliated to Maulana Abul Kalam Azad University
 St. Mary's P.G.College, Deshmukh vil. Pochampally M, Nalgonda Dist.- Affiliated to Osmania University
St Xavier’s PG College College-Affiliated to Osmania University

External links
St.Marys website
 St.Marys Group Google 360 Virtual Tour Hyderabad Campus
St. Mary's Technical Campus Kolkata

Catholic schools in India